Mabra lacriphaga is a moth in the family Crambidae(Crambid Snout Moths). It was described by Hans Bänziger in 1985. It is found in Thailand. They visit flowers of trumpet creeper and spotted horsemint. They are nocturnal.

References

Moths described in 1985
Pyraustinae
Moths of Asia